Kirby Jenner is a performance artist and internet celebrity. He rose to popularity for his Instagram account where he poses as Kendall Jenner's fraternal twin. He has received nominations for the Webby and Shorty Awards in Social Humor, Best Photography, and Parody Accounts.

Career 
Jenner describes himself as an  "amateur model." He began his Instagram account in July 2015. By November 2016, the account had 439,000 followers. His account has 1.4 million followers as of June 2020. Newsbeat describes Jenner as a Photoshop pro for his ability to crop himself into the images of Kendall Jenner although he claimed to not know anything about Photoshop in an interview with Bored Panda.

Kirby Jenner on Quibi 
In May 2020, Jenner's self-titled parody reality show premiered on Quibi. Kendall and Kris Jenner are the show's executive producers. It also features appearances from other members of the Kardashian family as well as several celebrities including Heidi Klum, Tan France, and Camille Kostek. In October 2020, Quibi shut down, and all content, including Kirby Jenner, moved to The Roku Channel.

Filmography

Awards and nominations

References

External links

Year of birth missing (living people)
Living people
21st-century American artists
American parodists
Jenner family
Pseudonymous artists